Stanislav Melnyk (11 July 1961 – 9 March 2015) was a Ukrainian businessman and politician.

Biography
He was member of the Verkhovna Rada of the fifth (2006–2007) and sixth (2007–2012) convocations for the Party of Regions.

Between 2002 and 2006 Melnyk was member of the Donetsk city council. He was manager of the Donetsk Brewery for six years and between 2005 and his election to the Verkhovna Rada he was CEO of 'Lux' JSC.

He was found shot dead in the bathroom of his apartment in Ukrainka, Kyiv Oblast on 9 March 2015. He was 53 years old. He left a suicide note asking for forgiveness.

References

External links
 Profile of Stanislav Melnyk at the Verkhovna Rada of Ukraine official website

1961 births
2015 suicides
Fifth convocation members of the Verkhovna Rada
Sixth convocation members of the Verkhovna Rada
Party of Regions politicians
Suicides by firearm in Ukraine
Businesspeople from Donetsk
Ukrainian politicians who committed suicide
Politicians from Donetsk